The former Australian Department of Families, Housing, Community Services and Indigenous Affairs (FaHCSIA) was a department of the Government of Australia located in Greenway in Canberra. It was formed in 2007 and absorbed the former Department of Families, Community Services and Indigenous Affairs. As a result of an Administrative Arrangements Order issued on 18 September 2013, the Department of Social Services was established and assumed most of the responsibilities of FaHCSIA; with indigenous affairs functions assumed by the Department of the Prime Minister and Cabinet.

Operational activities
The former department's role was to develop social policies and support affected Australian society and the living standards of Australian families. The Office of Indigenous Policy Coordination was a part of FaHCSIA. In the Administrative Arrangements Order of 3 December 2007, the functions of the department were broadly classified into the following matters: 
Income security policies and programs for families with children, carers, the aged and people in hardship
Services for families with children, people with disabilities and carers
Community support services, excluding the Home and Community Care program
Family relationship services
Housing policy co-ordination, welfare housing and rent assistance
Women's policies and programs
Indigenous policy co-ordination and the promotion of reconciliation
Community development employment projects

Administrative structure

The Secretaries of the department were:
 Dr Jeff Harmer (3 December 2007 to April 2011). Harmer had been appointed Secretary of the previous Department of Families and Community Services in October 2004.
 Mr Finn Pratt (April 2011 to 18 September 2013).

References

Families, Housing, Community Services and Indigenous Affairs
Australian
Housing in Australia
Public policy in Australia
Government agencies disestablished in 2013
Government agencies established in 2007
2007 establishments in Australia
2013 disestablishments in Australia
Social security in Australia
Indigenous affairs ministries